The women's discus throw at the 2018 European Athletics Championships took place at the Olympic Stadium on 9 and 11 August.

Records

Schedule

Results

Qualification
Qualification: 58.50 m (Q) or best 12 performers (q)

Final

References

discus throw W
Discus throw at the European Athletics Championships
Euro